Events of 2020 in Latvia.

Incumbents
President: Egils Levits
Prime Minister: Arturs Krišjānis Kariņš

Events 
9 January – Latvia makes their debut at the European Men's Handball Championship, in the 2020 edition.

Deaths 
 February 1 – Leons Briedis, poet and novelist (b. 1949)
 March 31 – Aleksei Frolikov, ice hockey player (b. 1957)
 April 29 – Jānis Lūsis, track and field athlete (b. 1939)
 July 6 – Juris Kronbergs, poet and translator (b. 1946)
 September 20 – Pavels Rebenoks, sworn advocate and politician (b. 1980)
 October 6 – Oļegs Karavajevs, football goalkeeper (b. 1961)
 November 16 – Laimonis Laizāns, football goalkeeper (b. 1945)
 November 27 – Dainis Liepiņš, cyclist (b. 1962)

References

 
2020s in Latvia
Years of the 21st century in Latvia
Latvia
Latvia